Cyclo Industries is a 'specialty chemicals' company in performance, maintenance, and appearance markets. The company was founded in 1959 and services the automotive, heavy-duty / fleet, industrial, agricultural and marine segments.  
Cyclo Industries is located in Jupiter, Florida, USA. The company has distributor relationships in over 80 countries across the world. In 2006, Pidilite Industries, headquartered in Mumbai, India acquired Cyclo Industries. The Cyclo brand was developed in 1959, with the first products being service chemicals, brand names being Carb Clean and Brake & Parts Clean. The original packaging was red, white, and blue to represent the company's American heritage and also for mechanics to distinguish the product easily on the shelf.

History
The company was established in 1959 in the United States. Cyclo started its brands as a line of service chemicals sold through traditional warehouse distributors to jobbers. Subsequently, the brand began to be sold to professional mechanics and individuals.
The first product was Carb Clean® Fast Gum Cutter.

Acquisitions
2000 – acquired the brand's Rain Dance, Rally, and No. 7 from Clorox.

2003 - acquired the brand, Tanner Preserve.

Brands
Breakaway — oil-based lubricant product; "The Best at Loosening the Toughest Jobs"
Max 44 — “Total Fuel Systems Cleaner and Lost Power Restore,” Max 44, an additive brand to enhance fuel economy
“The Lubricant Experts” product line — 8 Cyclo lubricant products including brands like Breakaway, Z Lube, and Fusion.
Engine Clean — an odor-free engine cleaning product.
Rain Dance — a range of car care appearance products, including car wash and wax lines.
Break-Thru — automotive cleaners, including brake and electrical cleaner products.

Automotive companies of the United States
Chemical companies of the United States
Manufacturing companies based in Florida
American companies established in 1959
Chemical companies established in 1959
1959 establishments in Florida